Mustafa Abdi (born 2 January 1984) is a Qatari footballer who currently plays.

Career
The defender has played for Al Rayyan for two seasons before returning to Al-Gharafa.

International goals

Notes

1984 births
Living people
People from Doha
Al-Gharafa SC players
Al-Rayyan SC players
Umm Salal SC players
Al-Arabi SC (Qatar) players
Al-Shamal SC players
Mesaimeer SC players
Qatari footballers
Naturalised citizens of Qatar
Qatar international footballers
Qatar Stars League players
Qatari Second Division players
2007 AFC Asian Cup players
Association football defenders
Qatari people of Somali descent